City Hall Plaza may refer to:

 City Hall Plaza (Boston), Massachusetts, USA
 City Hall Plaza (Manchester), New Hampshire, USA